Isogona is a genus of moths of the family Erebidae. The genus was erected by Achille Guenée in 1852.

Taxonomy
The genus has previously been classified in the subfamily Phytometrinae within Erebidae or in the subfamily Calpinae of the family Noctuidae.

Species
 Isogona natatrix Guenée, 1852
 Isogona punctipennis Grote, 1883
 Isogona scindens Walker, 1858
 Isogona segura Barnes, 1907
 Isogona snowi J. B. Smith, 1908 – Snow's owlet moth
 Isogona tenuis Grote, 1872 – thin-lined owlet moth
 Isogona texana J. B. Smith, 1900

References

Boletobiinae
Noctuoidea genera